Carlet is a municipality in the comarca of Ribera Alta in the Valencian Community, Spain.

Main sights 

 Hermitage of San Bernat: Chapel built above the Muslim king ́s palace who tortured his son Bernardo and his two daughters, María and Gracia, for having converted to Christianity. It is a building of a centralized floor formed by a double structure created by an outer heptagon involving the interior and circular floor. Above the interior zone there is a dome with Arabic tiles in blue characteristic of the Valencian domes.

References

External links
 

Municipalities in the Province of Valencia
Ribera Alta (comarca)